Fallon Sherrock (born 2 July 1994) is an English professional darts player who plays in World Darts Federation (WDF) and Professional Darts Corporation (PDC) events. Born in Milton Keynes, Sherrock reached the final of the 2015 BDO Women's World Darts Championship, where she was runner-up to Lisa Ashton. 

In 2019, Sherrock became the first female player to win a match, and subsequently, two consecutive matches, at the PDC World Championships, first by beating Ted Evetts 3–2 in the first round, and then Mensur Suljović 3–1 in the second round, before eventually losing 2–4 to Chris Dobey in the third round. The event saw her earn the nickname "Queen of the Palace" from the name of the venue, the Alexandra Palace.

During the 2021 Grand Slam of Darts, Sherrock became the first woman to reach the last 16 of a major darts tournament, after she beat Gabriel Clemens 5–3 in her final group stage match. She then went on to beat Mensur Suljović 10–5 in the last 16, to reach the quarter-finals and become the first woman in darts history to do so. She was beaten in the quarter-finals by Peter Wright 16–13.

In 2022, Sherrock also won the inaugural Women's World Matchplay. At the 2022 Grand Slam of Darts she went out in the first round after losing all three group games. She qualified for the 2023 World Championship but lost 3–1 in the first round to Ricky Evans.

Darts career 
Sherrock was born in Milton Keynes, Buckinghamshire. She began playing darts at the county youth level at the age of 17; her mother Sue and her father Steve had played the game on a recreational basis. She played for the Bedford Darts Organisation, and represented the England Youth team in the girls' singles division at the 2011 WDF Europe Cup Youth tournament. 

Sherrock was the Girls World Masters winner in 2012, along with the Women's Jersey Open, before following it up with success in the Women's British Classic in 2013. After finishing her A-level examinations, she opted against studying forensic science at university to focus on playing darts.

She appeared at the BDO World Championship for the first time in January 2014, where she made the Quarter Final. She beat Rilana Erades in round one by 2 sets to 0, and was just eliminated in the quarter-finals by reigning champion Anastasia Dobromyslova.

Sherrock improved on her debut performance by reaching the final of the 2015 BDO Ladies World Championship after she beat Dobromyslova 2–1 in the semi-finals at Lakeside, setting a world championship record by hitting five 180s in the semi-final. Sherrock lost 3–1 to Lisa Ashton in the final, but still impressed and hit six 180s in what was her first World Championship final.

On 17 December 2019, Sherrock became the first woman to beat a man at the PDC World Championships, beating Ted Evetts 3–2 in the first round at the 2020 World Championship. She followed this up with a 3–1 win over 11th seed Mensur Suljović in the second round, before losing to 22nd seed Chris Dobey 4–2 in the third round.

On 31 December 2019, Sherrock withdrew from the 2020 BDO Women's World Championship due to 'unexpected changes' to the event.

Sherrock was also invited to participate in German channel ProSieben's pro-am doubles event Die Promi-Darts-WM (Celebrity Darts World Cup) just after the World Championships alongside Phil Taylor, Michael van Gerwen, Gerwyn Price, Max Hopp and just-crowned world champion Peter Wright at the Maritim Hotel in Bonn. Sherrock partnered with former Italy striker and World Cup winner Luca Toni and went 1-3 during the event. 

Sherrock competed for a tour card at the 2020 PDC Q School, but was unable to secure one. On 1 February 2020, Sherrock won the Rileys Wolverhampton qualifier for the 2020 UK Open, meaning she would make her debut there. She lost to Kyle McKinstry from Northern Ireland 1–6 in the first round. 
 
She took part in the 2020 Premier League Darts as a 'challenger', appearing at the Motorpoint Arena Nottingham on 13 February 2020, where she drew 6-6 against Glen Durrant. She failed to qualify for the 2021 PDC World Championship, losing out to Deta Hedman on legs difference.	

Sherrock has faced hateful comments online after her PDC matches of 2019, but said she learned how to use the feeling to perform better; "If I'm feeling a bit slouchy, I'll look at some of the comments and I'll be like: 'OK, now I need to prove you wrong.''

In September 2021, Sherrock reached the final of the 2021 Nordic Darts Masters. In the first round she defeated Niels Heinsøe 6–1. She then had a walkover in her quarter-final match against Gerwyn Price, who withdrew due to an elbow injury. In the semi-finals she beat world n°5 Dimitri Van den Bergh 11–10, after initially trailing 9–3. She eventually lost to Michael van Gerwen 11–7 in the final (although having led 6–3). Sherrock is the only woman in the history of the PDC to have reached the final of a TV tournament. Just a week off her run to the Nordic Masters final, Sherrock competed in the first 2021 Women's Series events. Though she lost to tour card holder Lisa Ashton in the last 16 of the first event, she won the next two events with 5–2 and 5–3 victories over Corrine Hammond and Deta Hedman respectively. The second day saw Sherrock losing to Lisa Ashton in the finals of both events 4 and 5, before whitewashing the 4-time World Champion in the final of the sixth event. This let Sherrock maintain her place at the top of the ranking table and secure her debut at the 2021 Grand Slam of Darts.

In October 2021, Sherrock qualified for the 2022 World Championship, after ensuring a top-two finish in the PDC Women's Series. She lost 3–2 to Steve Beaton in the first round.

From June to August 2002, Sherrock competed in the invitational World Series of Darts. At the US Darts Masters she lost 6–2 to Leonard Gates in the first round. At the Nordic Darts Masters, she beat Darius Labanauskas 6–1 before losing 10–6 to Michael Smith. At the Dutch Darts Masters, she lost 6–1 to Maik Kuivenhoven in the first round. At the Queensland Darts Masters, she lost 6–3 to Gordon Mathers in the first round. At the New South Wales Darts Masters, she reached the quarter-finals, losing 6-0 to Gerwyn Price. At the New Zealand Darts Masters, she lost 6-5 to Kayden Milne in the first round. She was also invited to the World Series of Darts Finals, losing 6-4 to Peter Wright in the first round. 

In July 2022, Sherrock won the inaugural Women's World Matchplay, beating Katie Sheldon and Lorraine Winstanley to reach the final, where she defeated Aileen de Graaf 6-3. The win meant that Sherrock qualified for the 2022 Grand Slam of Darts. At the Grand Slam, Sherrock was eliminated in the group stage after losses to Peter Wright, Nathan Aspinall and Alan Soutar.

Sherrock appeared to have missed out on qualification for the 2023 PDC World Darts Championship after finishing third in the PDC Women's Series. However, the PDC subsequently announced that Sherrock had qualified for the event by virtue of winning the Women's World Matchplay, a decision which attracted criticism from some darts fans due to the mid-season rule change. At the World Championship, Sherrock was drawn to face Ricky Evans in the first round. After winning the opening set, she went on to lose 3–1.

In January 2023 Sherrock entered Q School. On the last day of the first stage of Q School Sherrock qualified for stage two by defeating Terry Winfield, Aaron Wood, Lee Davies, Colin Osborne and Steven Beasley. However, a 6-3 final day loss to Robert Collins meant she failed to win a tour card.

Later in 2023, during her 5-3 victory over Marco Verhofstad, Sherrock became the first woman to hit a nine dart finish at a PDC event.

World Championship results

BDO 
 2014: Quarter-finals (lost to Anastasia Dobromyslova 1–2)
 2015: Runner-up (lost to Lisa Ashton 1–3)
 2016: First round (lost to Ann-Louise Peters 1–2)
 2017: Quarter-finals (lost to Lisa Ashton 0–2)
 2018: Quarter-finals (lost to Lisa Ashton 0–2)
 2019: Quarter-finals (lost to Maria O'Brien 0–2)

PDC 
 2020: Third round (lost to Chris Dobey 2–4)
 2022: First round (lost to Steve Beaton 2–3)
 2023: First round (lost to Ricky Evans 1–3)

Career finals

WDF / BDO major finals: 5 (2 titles, 3 runners-up)

PDC World Series finals: 1 (1 runner-up)

Career statistics

(W) Won; (F) finalist; (SF) semifinalist; (QF) quarterfinalist; (#R) rounds 6, 5, 4, 3, 2, 1; (RR) round-robin stage; (Prel.) Preliminary round; (DNQ) Did not qualify; (DNP) Did not participate; (NH) Not held

Performance timeline

Personal life 
Sherrock has a son, born in 2014. Her twin sister Felicia also plays darts and the pair represented England Youth at the WDF Europe Cup Youth in 2011. In 2017, Sherrock had treatment for a kidney problem. This caused her face to swell up, for which she received online abuse. The condition made her teetotal and she is required to drink water regularly to keep her kidneys cleansed. Sherrock is currently in a relationship with PDC pro tour player Cameron Menzies.

Notes

References

External links 

 
 

English darts players
1994 births
Living people
British Darts Organisation players
People from Milton Keynes
Sportspeople from Buckinghamshire
Twin sportspeople
English twins
Professional Darts Corporation women's players